Garrett is the name of the following places in the U.S. state of Kentucky:

 Garrett, Floyd County, Kentucky
 Garrett, Meade County, Kentucky